Therese Torgersson (born March 28, 1976 in Göteborg) is a Swedish competitive sailor and Olympic medalist. She won a bronze medal in the 470 class at the 2004 Summer Olympics in Athens, together with Vendela Zachrisson.

References

External links

1976 births
Living people
Sportspeople from Gothenburg
Swedish female sailors (sport)
Sailors at the 2000 Summer Olympics – Europe
Sailors at the 2004 Summer Olympics – 470
Sailors at the 2008 Summer Olympics – 470
Olympic sailors of Sweden
Olympic bronze medalists for Sweden
Olympic medalists in sailing
Medalists at the 2004 Summer Olympics
470 class world champions
World champions in sailing for Sweden